Katrin Heß (pronounced Hess, born 26 June 1985) is a German actress, model, and voice-over artist.

Career 
Heß took a two-year training in acting at the Arturo Schauspielschule, Cologne. Following that, she made her first experiences with the theater in Cologne.

Heß rose to prominence with the television soap opera Verbotene Liebe (Forbidden Love) on Das Erste as Judith Hajedörp. In 2008, Heß played Pia Benning in episode 74 of the RTL action series 112 – Sie retten dein Leben.

In 2011, Heß began playing the role of Detective Jenny Dorn in the RTL series Alarm für Cobra 11 – Die Autobahnpolizei, which she continued until 2019. In the same year, she also appeared in Cologne P.D. and Countdown – Die Jagd beginnt.

Heß appeared alongside Ann-Kathrin Kramer and Stephan Kampwirth in the 2012 TV movie Alles Bestens.

Heß became a vegetarian in 2015.

The October 2017 issue of the German edition of Playboy magazine published a photo series with Heß as the cover model.

Heß is currently playing the role of Cindy Geldermacher in WDR's series Meuchelbeck.

Filmography 
 2008: 112 – Sie retten dein Leben
 2008–2009: Verbotene Liebe (episode 3106–3464)
 2011–2019: Alarm für Cobra 11 – Die Autobahnpolizei
 2011: Alles Bestens
 2011: Cologne P.D.
 2011: Countdown – Die Jagd beginnt
 2012: Danni Lowinski
 2012: Die Garmisch-Cops
 2014–2016: Herzensbrecher – Vater von vier Söhnen
 2014: Das Traumschiff
 2014: 
 2015: Einstein
 2015: Meuchelbeck
 2016: Cologne P.D.
 2016: Heldt
 2017: Hubert und Staller

Voice-over work 
2009: Summer Wars
2009–2010: Fullmetal Alchemist: Brotherhood
2011: Schwerter des Königs – Zwei Welten
2011: Blue Exorcist
2011–2014: Silk (TV series)
2012: Call the Midwife
2012: Sorority Party Massacre
2012–2014: Magi: The Labyrinth of Magic
2014: Nisekoi
2015: The Witcher 3: Wild Hunt
2015: Is It Wrong to Try to Pick Up Girls in a Dungeon?
2016: Class (2016 TV series)

References

External links 

 

1985 births
Living people
German film actresses
People from Aachen
German soap opera actresses
21st-century German actresses
German stage actresses
German female models